Sphaerolichus armipes is a mite species in the genus Sphaerolichus.

References

External links 
 

Trombidiformes
Animals described in 1904